Soltero (Spanish "bachelor") may refer to

People
Soltero (musician), the musical project of radio producer Tim Howard
Victor Soltero (born 1938), American politician from Arizona
Gonzalo Soltero, Mexican author
Susan Soltero (born 1961), Puerto Rican weather forecaster
Javier Soltero (born 1974), Puerto Rican entrepreneur

Film and TV
, 1977 film by Carlos Borcosque Jr.
Soltero (film), 1984 film with Manuel Conde

Other
Dean Soltero, a guitar manufactured by Dean Guitars

See also
 Solero (disambiguation)